Rik Smits (born 23 August 1966), nicknamed "the Dunking Dutchman" is a Dutch former professional basketball player who spent his entire career with the Indiana Pacers of the National Basketball Association (NBA). The  center was drafted by the Pacers out of Marist College with the second overall pick in the 1988 NBA draft. An NBA All-Star in 1998, Smits reached the NBA Finals in 2000.

Early life and college career

Smits was born in Eindhoven. He started playing basketball at age 14 at PSV–Almonte in Eindhoven. Smits left for the United States in 1984, where he played for Marist College for four years.

In 1986, Smits led Marist to the ECAC Metro Conference tournament Championship and advanced to play in their first NCAA tournament in school history. In 1987, he led the Red Foxes to 20 wins for the first time in its Division I history and another appearance in the NCAA tournament.

Smits briefly appeared in the 1988 film Coming to America during a scene filmed in 1987 while Marist played against St. John's at Madison Square Garden.

Smits was drafted second overall in the 1988 NBA draft by the Indiana Pacers, becoming the first Marist player to play in the NBA. His #45 jersey was later retired by Marist.

NBA career
He spent his entire professional career playing for the Indiana Pacers. With the Pacers, Smits originally backed up Steve Stipanovich, but when Stipanovich suffered a career-ending injury, Smits ended up starting 71 games in his rookie year, averaging 11.7 points and 6.1 rebounds per game and earning All-Rookie First Team honors. Smits continued to average double-digit point totals in every year of his career, but it wasn't until the 1993–94 NBA season that Smits really came into his own as a team leader.

Throughout the Pacers' playoff runs in the mid and late 1990s, Smits was considered the number two player, behind Reggie Miller, on the deeply talented Pacers. Smits' highest point-per-game average was in 1995–96 when he averaged 18.5 points per game, relatively modest by NBA "superstar" standards, but the Dutchman endeared himself to Pacers fans with outstanding playoff performances, most notably in Game 4 of the 1995 Eastern Conference Finals, where he made a buzzer-beating shot to tie the series.

Smits was named to the Eastern Conference All-Star Team in 1998, delivering 10 points, seven rebounds and four assists, including a spectacular behind-the-back pass to New Jersey Nets forward Jayson Williams who followed immediately with a slam dunk.

Smits developed nerve damage in his feet from wearing tight shoes as a teenager. To help recover during the off-season, he spent time relaxing at his summer retreat in Walton, New York, where he was a regular attendee of The Afton Fair. Foot problems hobbled Smits for the majority of his career, and he retired at the conclusion of the Pacers' 1999–2000 season, after Indiana was defeated by the Los Angeles Lakers in the NBA Finals 4 games to 2.
After four surgeries to repair nerve damage to his feet, Smits underwent intensive back surgery in November 2009 to correct cracks in one joint that link his vertebrae. Smits has also undergone arthroscopic surgery on his left knee and had bone chips removed from his left ankle.

Smits was selected to the Pacers' 40th Anniversary Team, which was chosen by the fans. He ended up with the fourth most votes, trailing only Reggie Miller, Mel Daniels and Jermaine O'Neal.

National team career
Smits has also played for the senior Netherlands national team. he played at 1986 FIBA World Championship, and at EuroBasket 1987.

Life after the NBA
After his retirement, Smits has devoted his time to collecting and racing vintage motocross motorcycles. On 30 November 2011, Smits was featured in Yahoo! Sports, about his formal participation in competitive motocross racing. In 2008 Smits won the AHRMA Vintage National Premier 500 Intermediate Class riding a BSA 500.

In 1998, near the end of his playing career, Smits bought a home in the Indianapolis suburb of Zionsville, Indiana, and continued to live in the home for nearly 20 years, expanding it in 2014 to include a regulation-size basketball half-court. Smits used two barns on the  property to house his motorcycles and cars, and built a dedicated motorcycle track in the rear of the property. He and his girlfriend put the property up for sale in the summer of 2017, shortly after they moved to Arizona.

NBA career statistics

Regular season

|-
| style="text-align:left;"|
| style="text-align:left;"|Indiana
| 82 || 71 || 24.9 || .517 || .000 || .722 || 6.1 || .9 || .4 || 1.8 || 11.7
|-
| style="text-align:left;"|
| style="text-align:left;"|Indiana
| 82 || 82 || 29.3 || .533 || .000 || .811 || 6.2 || 1.7 || .6 || 2.1 || 15.5
|-
| style="text-align:left;"|
| style="text-align:left;"|Indiana
| 76 || 38 || 22.2 || .485 ||  || .762 || 4.7 || 1.1 || .3 || 1.5 || 10.9
|-
| style="text-align:left;"|
| style="text-align:left;"|Indiana
| 74 || 55 || 23.9 || .510 || .000 || .788 || 5.6 || 1.6 || .4 || 1.4 || 13.8
|-
| style="text-align:left;"|
| style="text-align:left;"|Indiana
| 81 || 81 || 25.6 || .486 ||  || .732 || 5.3 || 1.5 || .3 || .9 || 14.3
|-
| style="text-align:left;"|
| style="text-align:left;"|Indiana
| 78 || 75 || 27.1 || .534 || .000 || .793 || 6.2 || 2.0 || .6 || 1.0 || 15.7
|-
| style="text-align:left;"|
| style="text-align:left;"|Indiana
| 78 || 78 || 30.5 || .526 || .000 || .753 || 7.7 || 1.4 || .5 || 1.0 || 17.9
|-
| style="text-align:left;"|
| style="text-align:left;"|Indiana
| 63 || 63 || 30.2 || .521 || .200 || .788 || 6.9 || 1.7 || .3 || .7 || 18.5
|-
| style="text-align:left;"|
| style="text-align:left;"|Indiana
| 52 || 52 || 29.2 || .486 || .250 || .797 || 6.9 || 1.3 || .4 || 1.1 || 17.1
|-
| style="text-align:left;"|
| style="text-align:left;"|Indiana
| 73 || 69 || 28.6 || .495 || .000 || .783 || 6.9 || 1.4 || .6 || 1.2 || 16.7
|-
| style="text-align:left;"|
| style="text-align:left;"|Indiana
| 49 || 49 || 25.9 || .490 || .000 || .818 || 5.6 || 1.1 || .4 || 1.1 || 14.9
|-
| style="text-align:left;"|
| style="text-align:left;"|Indiana
| 79 || 79 || 23.4 || .484 || .000 || .739 || 5.1 || 1.1 || .2 || 1.3 || 12.9
|- class="sortbottom"
| style="text-align:center;" colspan="2"|Career
| 867 || 792 || 26.6 || .507 || .115 || .773 || 6.1 || 1.4 || .4 || 1.2 || 14.8
|- class="sortbottom"
| style="text-align:center;" colspan="2"|All-Star 
| 1 || 0 || 21.0 || .429 ||  || 1.000 || 7.0 || 4.0 || .0 || 2.0 || 10.0

Playoffs

|-
| style="text-align:left;"|1990
| style="text-align:left;"|Indiana
| 3 || 3 || 32.0 || .500 ||  || .818 || 5.3 || 1.0 || .7 || 1.3 || 12.3
|-
| style="text-align:left;"|1991
| style="text-align:left;"|Indiana
| 5 || 0 || 17.6 || .568 ||  || .875 || 3.6 || .4 || .2 || 1.4 || 9.8
|-
| style="text-align:left;"|1992
| style="text-align:left;"|Indiana
| 3 || 1 || 9.3 || .364 ||  || 1.000 || 2.0 || .0 || .7 || .3 || 3.3
|-
| style="text-align:left;"|1993
| style="text-align:left;"|Indiana
| 4 || 4 || 35.8 || .578 || .000 || .727 || 8.0 || 1.8 || 1.2 || 1.0 || 22.5
|-
| style="text-align:left;"|1994
| style="text-align:left;"|Indiana
| 16 || 16 || 28.1 || .472 ||  || .806 || 5.3 || 1.9 || .6 || .6 || 16.0
|-
| style="text-align:left;"|1995
| style="text-align:left;"|Indiana
| 17 || 17 || 32.1 || .547 || 1.000 || .804 || 7.0 || 2.0 || .3 || .8 || 20.1
|-
| style="text-align:left;"|1996
| style="text-align:left;"|Indiana
| 5 || 5 || 33.2 || .545 ||  || .786 || 7.4 || 1.6 || .4 || .4 || 19.0
|-
| style="text-align:left;"|1998
| style="text-align:left;"|Indiana
| 16 || 16 || 29.8 || .502 || .000 || .859 || 5.3 || 1.3 || .5 || .9 || 16.6
|-
| style="text-align:left;"|1999
| style="text-align:left;"|Indiana
| 13 || 13 || 22.5 || .456 ||  || .950 || 5.0 || .7 || .5 || 1.2 || 11.8
|-
| style="text-align:left;"|2000
| style="text-align:left;"|Indiana
| 22 || 21 || 21.0 || .498 || .000 || .875 || 3.5 || 1.0 || .4 || .9 || 11.0
|- class="sortbottom"
| style="text-align:center;" colspan="2"|Career
| 104 || 96 || 26.4 || .507 || .250 || .829 || 5.2 || 1.3 || .5 || .9 || 14.8

Personal life
Derrik was forced to redshirt the 2015–16 season due to an injury, and began play the following season at Valparaiso. He graduated from Valparaiso in December 2018, taking graduate-level courses in the 2019 spring term to maintain his basketball eligibility; his graduation made him immediately eligible to play at Butler.

See also

 List of NBA players who have spent their entire career with one franchise
 List of tallest players in National Basketball Association history

References

External links

 NBA Bio & Stats
 Where Are They Now? Rik Smits - ESPN Video

1966 births
Living people
1986 FIBA World Championship players
Centers (basketball)
Dutch expatriate basketball people in the United States
Dutch men's basketball players
Indiana Pacers draft picks
Indiana Pacers players
Marist Red Foxes men's basketball players
National Basketball Association All-Stars
National Basketball Association players from the Netherlands
Sportspeople from Eindhoven